Phymatodiscus is a genus of mites in the family Trachyuropodidae.

Species
 Phymatodiscus aokii Hiramatsu, 1985      
 Phymatodiscus coniferus (Canestrini, 1897)      
 Phymatodiscus haradai Hiramatsu, 1985      
 Phymatodiscus ignesemovens Hirschmann, 1977      
 Phymatodiscus iriomotensis Hiramatsu, 1979      
 Phymatodiscus mirabilis Hirschmann, 1977      
 Phymatodiscus mirandus (Berlese, 1905)      
 Phymatodiscus oculatus Hirschmann, 1977      
 Phymatodiscus polyglottis Hirschmann, 1977      
 Phymatodiscus titanicus (Berlese, 1905)

References

Acari genera
Mesostigmata
Articles created by Qbugbot